The Naval War College is a staff college providing training and education primarily to the mid-career officers of the Pakistan Navy as well as to a limited number of officers from Pakistan Air Force, Pakistan Army and various allied forces. It is located at Walton, Lahore, Punjab in Pakistan.

The College was previously affiliated with Bahria University but has recently been affiliated with the National Defence University (NDU) along with other staff and war colleges of Pakistan Army and Air Force.

History
The genesis of Pakistan Navy War College started with Pakistan Navy Staff School at Manora Island off Karachi in 1968 to conduct Junior Staff Courses to teach elementary staff work, which was later upgraded to War College in 1971 n 
shifted to PNS Karsaz. In 1995, the College was shifted to Lahore with a dedicated building on Mall Road, which was inaugurated in August 1996. As of 2014, a new purpose-built campus had been constructed in Walton, where the war college was finally shifted to.

Courses
PN War college conducts Staff Course for officers of the Pakistan Navy. Around 60 to 65 officers of the Pakistan Navy, with 2 officers each from the Army and Air Force, and 10 to 12 International students from various countries attend this year-long course. The course is quite demanding consisting of staff skills related studies, naval operational art, military history, war games, research paper and a large number of lectures delivered by prominent national and international guest speakers. On successful completion of Staff Course, the participants are awarded 'pns' symbol by the College and M.Sc. in War Studies by the National Defence University, Pakistan in Islamabad. In 2017, Admiral Muhammad Zakaullah addressed the 46th naval course at the Pakistan Naval War College and vowed to equip Pakistan Navy with the latest equipment.

Graduation ceremony
In 2015, then Chief of Naval Staff, Admiral Muhammad Zakaullah addressed a convocation ceremony at the Pakistan Navy War College, Lahore. He was quoted as saying, "As hegemonic and domineering mindset solidifies in our neighborhood, we cannot be oblivious to threats to our sovereignty and national security."

References

External links 
 Pakistan Navy War College official website Archived
Pakistan Naval War College official website

Staff colleges
Pakistan Navy facilities
Pakistan Naval War College
Military education and training in Pakistan